Paul Fedor is an American music video director and visual effects designer.

Fedor studied illustration at the Parsons School of Design and has been a part of the computer graphics industry since 1994. He directed music videos and commercials.

He is the founder of the production company Natural Selection.

He has authored one book, "Essence: The Face" by Ballistic Publishing. "The Face" was the first book on modern texturing and look development of CG Humans and Digi-Doubles for Video Games, TV, and Film.

Filmography
 National Treasure: Book of Secrets (2007)
 Cirque du Freak: The Vampire's Assistant (2009)
 2012 (2009)
 The Sorcerer's Apprentice (2010)
 Unstoppable (2010)
 The Next Three Days (2010)
 All Good Things (2010)
 Immortals (2011)
 The Devil Inside (2012)
 Journey 2: The Mysterious Island (2012)
 Hotel Transylvania (2012)
 Mockingbird Lane (2012)
 Pacific Rim (2013)
 Captain America: The Winter Soldier (2014)
 Divergent (2014)
 Godzilla (2014)
 Game of Thrones (2014)
 Furious 7 (2015)
 San Andreas (2015)
 Pan (2015)
 In the Heart of the Sea (2015)
 Alice Through the Looking Glass (2016)
 Star Trek Beyond (2016)
 Fantastic Beasts and Where to Find Them (2016)
 Sleepy Hollow (2017)
 The Fate of the Furious (2017)
 Siren (2018)

Videography

 "Get Born Again", Alice in Chains (1999)
 "Giving In", Adema (2001)
 "The Nobodies", Marilyn Manson (2001)
 "The Middle", Jimmy Eat World (2001)
 "Youth of the Nation", P.O.D. (2001)
 "Running Away", Hoobastank (2002)
 "Fine Again", Seether (2002)
 "The Game of Love", Santana featuring Michelle Branch (2002)
 "Capricorn (A Brand New Name)", Thirty Seconds to Mars (2002)
 "Fallen", Sarah McLachlan (2003)

 "Minerva", Deftones (2003)
 "Pain", Jimmy Eat World (2004)
 "Worn Me Down", Rachael Yamagata (2004)
 "World on Fire", Sarah McLachlan (2005)
 "Attack", Thirty Seconds to Mars (2005)
 "The Great Divide", Scott Stapp (2005)
 "Boston", Augustana (2006)
 "Lithium", Evanescence (2006)
 "All Around Me", Flyleaf (2007)

References

External links

American music video directors
Visual effects supervisors
Living people
Year of birth missing (living people)